The Pertuisane class (sometimes referred to as the Rochefortais class as they were all built in Rochefort) was a group of four destroyers built for the French Navy in the first decade of the 20th century. They survived the First World War only to be scrapped afterwards.

Ships 
  - launched 5 December 1900, stricken 16 March 1923.
  - launched 20 December 1900, stricken 4 April 1921. 
  - launched 28 October 1900, stricken 1 October 1920.
  - launched 16 July 1901, stricken 27 October 1921.

Escopette was sent by the French government on 25 July 1909 as a seaborne escort for Louis Blériot's English Channel-crossing flight.

Notes

Bibliography

 
 
 

Destroyer classes
Destroyers of the French Navy
 
 
Ship classes of the French Navy